The  Diocese of Veracruz is a Latin Church ecclesiastical territory of diocese of the Catholic Church in Mexico. It was erected 9 June 1962. The diocese is a suffragan in the ecclesiastical province of the metropolitan Archdiocese of Xalapa.

Bishops

Ordinaries
José Guadalupe Padilla Lozano (1963–2000)
Luis Gabriel Cuara Méndez (2000–2005) 
Luis Felipe Gallardo Martín del Campo, S.D.B. (2006-2018)
Carlos Briseño Arch, O.A.R. (2018- )

Other priest of this diocese who became bishop
Rutilo Muñoz Zamora, appointed Bishop of Coatzacoalcos, Veracruz in 2002

Episcopal See
Veracruz, Veracruz

External links and references

Veracruz
Veracruz, Roman Catholic Diocese of
Veracruz
Veracruz